is a 2015 Japanese animated science fiction film directed by Michael Arias and Takashi Nakamura, animated by Studio 4°C and based on the novel of the same name by Project Itoh. The film was released on November 13, 2015. Two other anime films based on novels by the same author were released: The Empire of Corpses on October 2, 2015 and Genocidal Organ on February 3, 2017.

Synopsis
In the future, after a nuclear cataclysm referred to as the "Maelstrom" and ensuing civil wars that almost wiped out humanity, peace and utopia have finally been achieved. Beyond country boundaries, society is controlled by the "Admedistration" and its WatchMe medical nanotechnology, devoted to protecting and extending human life, and is governed by a powerful ethic of social welfare and mutual consideration.

In Japan, three young women—Cian Reikado, Miach Mihie, and Tuan Kirie, the protagonist—reject this supposed "utopia" that lacks any true form of personal autonomy, and attempt suicide together, thereby committing the crime of rejecting life itself. While Miach succeeds in her attempt, Tuan and Cian are saved at the last moment.

Thirteen years later, Tuan is working as a senior investigator for the World Health Organization, but remains faithful to her ideas and delights in punishing her body. When she re-encounters her friend Cian and they recall their suicide pact and the loss of Miach, events unfold that will once again force Tuan to question her world and discover the truth behind this "perfect" world.

Voice cast

Release
The film was released on November 13, 2015, taking the release date of Genocidal Organ due to the latter's delay, moving from the previous release date of December 4.
Funimation has picked up the license for Harmony. It was released in the U.S. on May 17–18, 2016 in a two-day engagement.

References

External links
"Harmony" anime movie official website by Studio 4°C 
Funimation Films Page

2015 science fiction films
2015 anime films
Aniplex
Films based on Japanese novels
Funimation
Japanese animated science fiction films
Noitamina
Studio 4°C
LGBT-related animated films
LGBT in anime and manga
Films scored by Yoshihiro Ike
2015 LGBT-related films
Chechen wars films
Animated dystopian films